V Corporate Centre is a 12-storey building located at Makati, Philippines. It was developed by Vita Realty Corp and has a typical floor area of 1,100 sq. meters. It is one of the most technologically advanced buildings in the Philippines.

Location
V Corporate Centre is located in Salcedo Village, Makati, near Makati Sports Club.

References

External links
 Official website

 

Office buildings in Metro Manila
Office buildings completed in 2014
Buildings and structures in Makati
2014 establishments in the Philippines
21st-century architecture in the Philippines